The 1943 Wisconsin Badgers football team was an American football team that represented the University of Wisconsin in the 1943 Big Ten Conference football season. The team compiled a 1–9 record (1–6 against conference opponents) and finished in eighth place in the Big Ten Conference. Harry Stuhldreher was in his eighth year as Wisconsin's head coach.

Center Joe Keenan received the team's most valuable player award. Keenan was also the team captain. Ray Dooney led the Big Ten with an average of 39.0 yards per punt.

The team played its home games at Camp Randall Stadium. During the 1943 season, the average attendance at home games was 14,374.

Schedule

References

Wisconsin
Wisconsin Badgers football seasons
Wisconsin Badgers football